In the United States, railroads are designated as Class I, Class II, or Class III, according to size criteria first established by the Interstate Commerce Commission (ICC) in 1911, and now governed by the Surface Transportation Board (STB). The STB's current definition of a Class I railroad was set in 1992, that being any carrier earning annual revenue greater than $250 million. This has since been adjusted for inflation and most recently set to $504,803,294 in 2019.

This is a list of current and former Class I railroads in North America under the older criteria and the newer as well as today's much different post-railroad consolidation classifications.

Many of the more famous historical small railways possessing key trunk lines have been merged into one of today's behemoths.

Current Class I railroads
Today there are just five American owned Class I freight railroad companies and one passenger railroad company (Amtrak). The list also include two Canadian owned Class I freight railroads, both of which have trackage in the US.

Amtrak
BNSF Railway
Canadian National Railway
Canadian Pacific Railway
CSX Transportation
Kansas City Southern Railway (currently in the process of merging with Canadian Pacific Railway as of 3/16/2023)
Norfolk Southern Railway
Union Pacific Railroad

Former Class I railroads
This list includes very varied financial entities. From completely defunct companies, to operating companies with operations turned into investments, some hanging onto a corporate skeleton owning properties as holding companies, or have assigned their properties in mergers, bankruptcy or other legal acts (dissolution of the corporation) and finally others having become extinct—their works either torn up and hopefully recycled, or sold off to operating companies. This list does not indicate which is which.

Akron, Canton and Youngstown Railroad
Alabama Great Southern Railroad
Alabama, Tennessee and Northern Railroad
Alabama and Vicksburg Railway
Alton Railroad
Ann Arbor Railroad
Arizona Eastern Railroad
Arizona and New Mexico Railway
Atchison, Topeka and Santa Fe Railway
Atlanta, Birmingham and Atlantic Railway
Atlanta, Birmingham and Coast Railroad
Atlanta and St. Andrews Bay Railway
Atlanta and West Point Railroad
Atlantic City Railroad
Atlantic Coast Line Railroad
Atlantic and Danville Railway
Atlantic and St. Lawrence Railroad
Auto-Train Corporation
Baltimore, Chesapeake and Atlantic Railway
Baltimore and Ohio Railroad
Bangor and Aroostook Railroad
Beaumont, Sour Lake and Western Railway
Bessemer and Lake Erie Railroad
Bingham and Garfield Railway
Boston and Maine Corporation
Boston and Maine Railroad
Buffalo, Rochester and Pittsburgh Railway
Buffalo and Susquehanna Railroad
Burlington Northern Inc.
Burlington Northern Railroad
Burlington-Rock Island Railroad
Butte, Anaconda and Pacific Railway
Cambria and Indiana Railroad
Canadian National Lines in New England
Canadian Northern Railway
Canadian Pacific Lines in Maine
Canadian Pacific Lines in Vermont
Carolina, Clinchfield and Ohio Railway
Carolina and Northwestern Railway
Central of Georgia Railway
Central New England Railway
Central Railroad of New Jersey
Central Railroad of Pennsylvania
Central Vermont Railway
Charleston and Western Carolina Railway
Chesapeake and Ohio Railway
Chesapeake and Ohio Railway of Indiana
Chicago and Alton Railroad
Chicago, Burlington and Quincy Railroad
Chicago, Detroit and Canada Grand Trunk Junction Railroad
Chicago and Eastern Illinois Railroad
Chicago and Erie Railroad
Chicago Great Western Railroad
Chicago and Illinois Midland Railway
Chicago, Indiana and Southern Railroad
Chicago, Indianapolis and Louisville Railway
Chicago, Milwaukee and Puget Sound Railway
Chicago, Milwaukee, St. Paul and Pacific Railroad (The Milwaukee Road)
Chicago and North Western Transportation Company
Chicago, Peoria and St. Louis Railroad
Chicago, Rock Island and Gulf Railway
Chicago, Rock Island and Pacific Railroad
Chicago, St. Paul, Minneapolis and Omaha Railway
Chicago Southern Railway
Chicago, Terre Haute and Southeastern Railway
Cincinnati, Hamilton and Dayton Railway
Cincinnati, Indianapolis and Western Railroad
Cincinnati, Lebanon and Northern Railway
Cincinnati, New Orleans and Texas Pacific Railway
Cincinnati Northern Railroad
Cleveland, Akron and Cincinnati Railway
Cleveland, Akron and Columbus Railway
Cleveland, Cincinnati, Chicago and St. Louis Railway
Clinchfield Railroad
Coal and Coke Railway
Colorado Midland Railroad
Colorado Midland Railway
Colorado and Southern Railway
Colorado and Wyoming Railway
Columbus and Greenville Railroad
Columbus and Greenville Railway
Consolidated Rail Corporation
Conrail
Copper River and Northwestern Railway
Cripple Creek and Colorado Springs Railroad
Cumberland Valley Railroad
Cumberland Valley and Martinsburg Railroad
Delaware and Hudson Company
Delaware and Hudson Railroad
Delaware and Hudson Railway
Delaware, Lackawanna and Western Railroad
Denver, Northwestern and Pacific Railway
Denver and Rio Grande Railroad
Denver and Rio Grande Western Railroad
Denver and Salt Lake Railroad
Denver and Salt Lake Railway
Detroit, Grand Haven and Milwaukee Railway
Detroit and Mackinac Railway
Detroit, Toledo and Ironton Railroad
Detroit, Toledo and Ironton Railway
Detroit and Toledo Shore Line Railroad
Duluth and Iron Range Railroad
Duluth, Missabe and Iron Range Railway
Duluth, Missabe and Northern Railway
Duluth, South Shore and Atlantic Railway
Duluth, Winnipeg and Pacific Railway
El Paso and Southwestern Company
Elgin, Joliet and Eastern Railway
Erie Railroad
Erie-Lackawanna Railroad
Erie Lackawanna Railway
Evansville, Indianapolis and Terre Haute Railway
Evansville and Terre Haute Railroad
Florence and Cripple Creek Railroad
Florida East Coast Railway
Fonda, Johnstown and Gloversville Railroad
Fort Smith and Western Railroad
Fort Smith and Western Railway
Fort Worth and Denver Railway
Fort Worth and Denver City Railway
Fort Worth and Rio Grande Railway
Galveston, Harrisburg and San Antonio Railway
Georgia Railroad
Georgia and Florida Railroad
Georgia and Florida Railway
Georgia Southern and Florida Railway
Grand Canyon Railway
Grand Rapids and Indiana Railway
Grand Trunk Corporation
Grand Trunk Western Railroad
Grand Trunk Western Railway
Great Northern Railway
Green Bay and Western Railroad
Gulf, Colorado and Santa Fe Railway
Gulf, Mobile and Northern Railroad
Gulf, Mobile and Ohio Railroad
Gulf and Ship Island Railroad
Hocking Valley Railway
Houston East and West Texas Railway
Houston and Texas Central Railroad
Illinois Central Railroad
Illinois Central Gulf Railroad
Illinois Terminal Company
Illinois Terminal Railroad
Indianapolis Southern Railroad
International-Great Northern Railroad
International and Great Northern Railroad
International and Great Northern Railway
International Railway of Maine
Iowa Central Railway 
Kanawha and Michigan Railway
Kansas City, Mexico and Orient Railroad
Kansas City, Mexico and Orient Railway
Kansas City, Mexico and Orient Railway of Texas
Kansas, Oklahoma and Gulf Railway
Lake Erie and Western Railroad
Lake Shore and Michigan Southern Railway
Lake Superior and Ishpeming Railroad
Lake Superior and Ishpeming Railway
Lehigh and Hudson River Railway
Lehigh and New England Railroad
Lehigh Valley Railroad
Litchfield and Madison Railway
Long Island Rail Road
Los Angeles and Salt Lake Railroad
Louisiana and Arkansas Railway
Louisiana, Arkansas and Texas Railway
Louisiana Railway and Navigation Company
Louisiana Railway and Navigation Company of Texas
Louisiana Western Railroad
Louisville, Henderson and St. Louis Railway
Louisville and Nashville Railroad
Maine Central Railroad
Maryland, Delaware and Virginia Railway
Michigan Central Railroad
Michigan Interstate Railway
Midland Valley Railroad
Mineral Range Railroad
Minneapolis, Northfield and Southern Railway
Minneapolis and St. Louis Railroad
Minneapolis and St. Louis Railway
Minneapolis, St. Paul and Sault Ste. Marie Railroad (Soo Line)
Minneapolis, St. Paul and Sault Ste. Marie Railway
Minnesota and International Railway
Mississippi Central Railroad
Missouri and Arkansas Railway
Missouri-Illinois Railroad
Missouri-Kansas-Texas Railroad (Katy)
Missouri, Kansas and Texas Railway
Missouri-Kansas-Texas Railroad of Texas
Missouri, Kansas and Texas Railway of Texas
Missouri and North Arkansas Railroad
Missouri and North Arkansas Railway
Missouri, Oklahoma and Gulf Railway
Missouri Pacific Railroad
Missouri Pacific Railway
Mobile and Ohio Railroad
Monon Railroad
Monongahela Railroad
Monongahela Railway
Montour Railroad
Morgan's Louisiana and Texas Railroad and Steamship Company
Nashville, Chattanooga and St. Louis Railway
National Railroad Passenger Corporation (Amtrak)
Nevada Northern Railway
New Jersey and New York Railroad
New Orleans Great Northern Railroad
New Orleans, Mobile and Chicago Railroad
New Orleans and Northeastern Railroad
New Orleans, Texas and Mexico Railroad
New Orleans, Texas and Mexico Railway
New York Central Railroad
New York Central and Hudson River Railroad
New York, Chicago and St. Louis Railroad (Nickel Plate Road)
New York Connecting Railroad
New York, New Haven and Hartford Railroad
New York, Ontario and Western Railway
New York, Philadelphia and Norfolk Railroad
New York, Susquehanna and Western Railroad
Norfolk Southern Railroad
Norfolk Southern Railway (1942-1982)
Norfolk and Western Railway
Northern Alabama Railway
Northern Central Railway
Northern Pacific Railway
Northwestern Pacific Railroad
Oahu Railway and Land Company
Oklahoma City-Ada-Atoka Railway
Oregon Electric Railway
Oregon Railroad and Navigation Company
Oregon Short Line Railroad
Oregon-Washington Railroad and Navigation Company
Pacific Electric Railway
Panhandle and Santa Fe Railway
Pecos and Northern Texas Railway
Penn Central Transportation Company
Pennsylvania Railroad
Pennsylvania Company
Pennsylvania-Reading Seashore Lines
Peoria and Eastern Railway
Pere Marquette Railroad
Pere Marquette Railway
Perkiomen Railroad
Philadelphia, Baltimore and Washington Railroad
Philadelphia and Reading Railway
Piedmont and Northern Railway
Pittsburgh, Cincinnati, Chicago and St. Louis Railroad
Pittsburgh and Lake Erie Railroad
Pittsburg and Shawmut Railroad
Pittsburg, Shawmut and Northern Railroad
Pittsburgh and West Virginia Railway
Port Reading Railroad
Quanah, Acme and Pacific Railway
Quincy, Omaha and Kansas City Railroad
Reading Company
Richmond, Fredericksburg and Potomac Railroad
Rutland Railroad
Rutland Railway
Sacramento Northern Railway
St. Joseph and Grand Island Railway
St. Louis, Brownsville and Mexico Railway
St. Louis, Iron Mountain and Southern Railway
St. Louis-San Francisco Railway (Frisco)
St. Louis and San Francisco Railroad
St. Louis, San Francisco and Texas Railway
St. Louis Southwestern Railway (Cotton Belt)
St. Louis Southwestern Railway of Texas
San Antonio and Aransas Pass Railway
San Antonio, Uvalde and Gulf Railroad
San Diego and Arizona Railway
San Diego and Arizona Eastern Railway
San Pedro, Los Angeles and Salt Lake Railroad
Santa Fe, Prescott and Phoenix Railway
Savannah and Atlanta Railway
Seaboard Air Line Railroad
Seaboard Air Line Railway
Seaboard Coast Line Railroad
Seaboard System Railroad
Soo Line Railroad
Southern Indiana Railway
Southern Kansas Railway of Texas
Southern Pacific Company
Southern Pacific Transportation Company
Southern Railway
Southern Railway in Mississippi
Spokane and Inland Empire Railroad
Spokane International Railroad
Spokane International Railway
Spokane, Portland and Seattle Railway
Staten Island Rapid Transit Railway
Sunset Railroad
Syracuse, Binghamton and New York Railroad
Tennessee Central Railroad
Tennessee Central Railway
Texarkana and Fort Smith Railway
Texas Mexican Railway
Texas and New Orleans Railroad
Texas and Northern Railway
Texas and Pacific Railway
Toledo and Ohio Central Railway
Toledo, Peoria and Western Railroad
Toledo, Peoria and Western Railway
Toledo, St. Louis and Western Railroad
Trinity and Brazos Valley Railway
Ulster and Delaware Railroad
Utah Railway
Vandalia Railroad
Via Rail Canada *
Vicksburg, Shreveport and Pacific Railway
Virginia and Southwestern Railway
Virginian Railway
Wabash Railroad
Wabash Railway
Wabash Pittsburgh Terminal Railway
Washington Southern Railway
West Jersey and Seashore Railroad
Western Railway of Alabama
Western Maryland Railway
Western Pacific Railroad
Western Pacific Railway
Wheeling and Lake Erie Railroad
Wheeling and Lake Erie Railway
Wichita Falls and Northwestern Railway
Wichita Falls and Southern Railroad
Wichita Valley Railway
Wisconsin Central Railroad
Wisconsin Central Railway
Yazoo and Mississippi Valley Railroad

References

 List
 List
Class I railroads